Arncroach is a small village situated in the east of Fife, four miles inland of the fishing village of Pittenweem and around 10 miles away from St Andrews, on the east coast of Scotland. The village green is named after Louise Lorimer. Arncroach is within the parish of Carnbee.
Situated about 1/4 of a mile from Arncroach is Kellie Castle, formerly the seat of the Earl of Kellie, and is also where the famous Lorimer family lived. The village saw the installation of the first wind turbine in the East Neuk area of Fife, directly adjacent to the Gillingshill Nature Reserve.

Geology and geography 
Arncroach is situated at the foot of Kellie Law, a small hill which is visible from the Firth of Forth.
The village has a population of around 120 people.

Notable residents 
Furniture maker, William Wheeler of Arncroach. Designer and maker of Chippendale and Gossip Chairs circa 1880.

Education 
Arncroach once had two schools, despite it only being a very small village. One was a boys' school and the other was for girls. Later they were combined, as having two became impractical. The Old School of Arncroach has been a residential home since the school was closed in the mid-1990s. Children living in the village and surrounding area now have to travel to Pittenweem or Colinsburgh Primarys, and Waid Academy in Anstruther for secondary education.

References

Villages in Fife